Kishen Das is an Indian actor, content creator and YouTuber, known for his role in the Tamil film Mudhal Nee Mudivum Nee which is streaming on ZEE5. Kishen also hosts the popular show Menu Please on Youtube for Netflix, some of his guests over the years have been Anil Kapoor, Shahid Kapoor, Vijay Sethupathi, Gautham Vasudev Menon, Neeraj Madhav etc.

Early life
 
Kishen was born on  26 April 1997 in Chennai. His mother Brinda Das is a well-known theatre and television actor. In many interviews Kishen has mentioned that he was a very silent child growing up who was average at anything and everything. Life took a turn when he ventured into theatre in Chettinad Vidyashram, under the guidance of Mr Jayakumar Janakiraman of the Koothupattarai. His interest for performing and acting began just around then and was a part of Chennai's theatre circuit till college. His love for cinema and media saw him fall for the effective cliche of Visual Communication at Loyola College, Chennai. Knowing that the competition in the field was unreal and in an attempt to get a head start, Kishen ventured out in search of some work when he found Fully Filmy. Kishen's association with Fully Filmy began in 2016 when he was working part-time and studying at Loyola and went on till 2019 when he decided to take the plunge and actively look for acting work. During his time at Fully Filmy, he was known for Fully Rewind, a show wherein he would present listicles about cinema and the infamous '2 minute reviews' which were very popular back then.   

Apart from his youtube work, he has also featured in multiple national advertisements and takes pride in being a content creator on Instagram who works with brands on a regular basis. His podcast 'Timepass with Das' which he began in 2019 officially became a Spotify Original in May 2022.

Film career

During his stint at Fully Filmy, he came across an audition announcement for a film shared by Gautham Vasudev Menon. Being the fanboy he is, he applied and went through 4-5 rounds of auditions and meetings before he was cast in this untitled project directed by the famous Mr X a.k.a. Darbuka Siva. They began filming this ensemble in 2019 with updates on the project, songs, and teasers consecutively. The title of the film was revealed to be Mudhal Nee Mudivum Nee or MNMN, coined after the famous lines from his previous song 'Maruvaarthai'. The film also saw the hit combo of Darbuka Siva, Thamarai and Sid Sriram collaborate on the title track of the film which amassed over 65 million streams/views overall. MNMN was released on Zee5 OTT on 21 January 2022 and was met with positive responses. Kishen played the role of Vinoth, a school going boy whose love for music and hatred for studies overtook everything in life. His love for Rekha and his dynamic with Rekha dictated his storyline in the film. The film won multiple awards and special mentions since its release. 

Das is currently working on an untitled independent film in Tamil which is set to release in 2022.

Filmography

References

1997 births
Living people